Tutkabon (also Romanized as Tūtkābon and Tutkabun; also known as  Tonkābon) is a city and capital of Rahmatabad and Blukat District, in Rudbar County of Gilan Province, in northern Iran.

It is located on the Sefīd-Rūd river, in the Alborz (Elburz) mountain range.

At the 2006 census, its population was 1,671, in 473 families.

References

Cities in Gilan Province
Populated places in Rudbar County
Settled areas of Elburz